The 3rd season of the television series Arthur was originally broadcast on PBS in the United States from November 16, 1998 to January 1, 1999 and contains 15 episodes. This season, like seasons 1 and 2, was released on DVD in Europe only (as "Series 4").

This was the last season in which Michael Caloz voiced the character D.W. Read, due to his voice deepening after the end of the season.

Episodes

Reception
Going into the premiere of this season, Arthur was ranked as the #1 kids program on PBS, and the #1  program on TV for kids ages 5 - 12.

References

General references 
 
 
 
 

1998 American television seasons
1998 Canadian television seasons
1999 American television seasons
1999 Canadian television seasons
Arthur (TV series) seasons